The 2003 WUSA College Draft took place on February 2, 2003. It was the third and final college draft held by Women's United Soccer Association (WUSA) to assign the rights of college players to the WUSA teams.

Round 1

Round 2

Round 3

Round 4

See also
 List of WUSA drafts

References

2003
Draft